A facial is a family of skin care treatments for the face, including steam, exfoliation (physical and chemical), extraction, creams, lotions, facial masks, peels, and massage. They are normally performed in beauty salons, but are also a common spa treatment. They are used for general skin health as well as for specific skin conditions. Types of facials include European facial, LED light therapy facials, hydrafacials and mini-facials.

Facial mask 
There are different kinds of masks (e.g., clay, cactus, cucumber) for different purposes: deep-cleansing, by penetrating the pores; healing acne scars or hyper-pigmentation; brightening, for a gradual illumination of the skin tone. Facial masks also help with anti-aging, acne, crows feet, under eye bags, sagging lids, dark circles, puffiness, and more. Some masks are designed to dry or solidify on the face, almost like plaster; others just remain wet. The perceived effects of a facial mask treatment include revitalizing, healing, or refreshing; they may yield temporary benefits (depending on environmental, dietary, and other skincare factors). There is little to no objective evidence that there are any long-term benefits to the various available facial treatments.

Masks are removed by either rinsing the face with water, wiping off with a damp cloth, or peeling off of the face. Duration for wearing a mask varies with the type of mask, and manufacturer's usage instructions. The time can range from a few minutes to overnight. Those with sensitive skin are advised to first test out the mask on a small portion of the skin, in order to check for any irritations. Some facial masks are not suited to frequent use. A glycolic mask should not be used more frequently than once a month to avoid the risk of burning the skin.

Masks can be found anywhere from drugstores to department stores and can vary in consistency and form. Setting masks include: clay, which is a thicker consistency, and will draw out impurities (and sometimes, natural oils, too) from the pores; a cream, which stays damp to hydrate the skin; sheet-style, in which a paper mask is dampened with liquid to tone and moisturize the skin; and lastly, a hybrid/clay and cream form that includes small beads for removing dead surface skin cells. Non-setting facial masks include warm oil and paraffin wax masks. These different forms are made to suit different skin types (e.g., oily or dry), and different skincare goals or needs (e.g., moisturizing, cleansing, exfoliating). Clay and mud masks suit oily and some "combination" skin types, while cream-based masks tend to suit dry and sensitive skin types. There are also peel-off masks which are great for when you need to remove thin layers of dead skin cells and dirt.

Back "facial" 
A back facial applies the same techniques as would normally be applied to the face in order to alleviate rough skin and "backne," or acne which appears on the back. According to the Universal Spa Training Academy, back treatments help to unclog pores by exfoliating, toning, and nourishing the skin. Back facials are also a great way to ease tension on the back muscles and heal dry skin. The first step of a back facial is cleansing and exfoliating; a mask is then applied followed by moisturizer and a massage.

See also
Spa treatment
Acne
Skin care

References 

Human head and neck
Skin care